The Gods of Guilt is the 26th novel by American author Michael Connelly and his fifth to feature Los Angeles criminal defense attorney Mickey Haller.  The book was published in the United States on December 2, 2013.

The novel follows Haller as he takes on the case of Andre La Cosse, a "digital pimp" who allegedly murdered Gloria Dayton, an old friend of Haller's.

Connelly's signature character Harry Bosch appears in the book but does not play a major role. The novel is so named because Haller describes members of a jury as "gods of guilt."

External links 
 MichaelConnelly.com bookpage
 "Michael Connelly explains 'The Black Box,' Tampa author's 25th book," Colette Bancroft, Tampa Bay Times, 8 December 2012.

Novels by Michael Connelly
Novels set in Los Angeles
2013 American novels
Little, Brown and Company books